In mathematics, the Bussgang theorem is a theorem of stochastic analysis. The theorem states that the cross-correlation of a Gaussian signal before and after it has passed through a nonlinear operation are equal up to a constant. It was first published by Julian J. Bussgang in 1952 while he was at the Massachusetts Institute of Technology.

Statement

Let  be a zero-mean stationary Gaussian random process and  where  is a nonlinear amplitude distortion.

It can be further shown that

Derivation for One-bit Quantization 

 

 .

Since

 ,
the correlation   may be simplified as

 .

Therefore, the correlation can be rewritten in the form.The above equation is the mathematical expression of the stated "Bussgang‘s theorem".

If , or called one-bit quantization, then .

Arcsine law 

When , the expression becomes,where .

Noticing that

,

we can simplify the expression of  asAlso, it is convenient to introduce the polar coordinate . It is thus found that

.

Integration gives，This is called "Arcsine law", which was first found by J. H. Van Vleck in 1943 and republished in 1966. The "Arcsine law" can also be proved in a simpler way by applying Price's Theorem.

The function  can be approximated as  when  is small.

Price's Theorem 

Proof of Arcsine law by Price's Theorem 
If , then  where  is the Dirac delta function. 

Substituting into Price's Theorem, we obtain,.When , . Thus,which is Van Vleck's well-known result of "Arcsine law".

Application
This theorem implies that a simplified correlator can be designed. Instead of having to multiply two signals, the cross-correlation problem reduces to the gating of one signal with another.

References

Further reading
 E.W. Bai; V. Cerone; D. Regruto (2007) "Separable inputs for the identification of block-oriented nonlinear systems", Proceedings of the 2007 American Control Conference (New York City, July 11–13, 2007) 1548–1553

Theorems regarding stochastic processes